is a hilltop Japanese castle located in Chūō-ku, Kumamoto, in Kumamoto Prefecture. It was a large and well fortified castle. The  is a concrete reconstruction built in 1960, but several ancillary wooden buildings remain of the original castle. Kumamoto Castle is considered one of the three premier castles in Japan, along with Himeji Castle and Matsumoto Castle. Thirteen structures in the castle complex are designated Important Cultural Property.

History
Kumamoto Castle's history dates to 1467, when fortifications were established by Ideta Hidenobu. In 1496, these fortifications were expanded by Kanokogi Chikakazu. In 1588, Katō Kiyomasa was transferred to the early incarnation of Kumamoto Castle. From 1601 to 1607, Kiyomasa greatly expanded the castle, transforming it into a castle complex with 49 turrets, 18 turret gates, and 29 smaller gates. The smaller castle tower, built sometime after the keep, had several facilities including a well and kitchen. In 1610, the Honmaru Goten Palace was completed.

The castle was besieged in 1877 during the Satsuma Rebellion, and the castle keep and other parts were burned down. 13 of the buildings in the castle complex were undamaged, and have been designated Important Cultural Properties. In 1960, the castle keep was reconstructed using concrete. From 1998 to 2008, the castle complex underwent restoration work, during which most of the 17th century structures were rebuilt.

The signature curved stone walls, known as musha-gaeshi, as well as wooden overhangs, were designed to prevent attackers from penetrating the castle. Rock falls were also used as deterrents.

In nearby San-no-Maru Park is the Hosokawa Gyobu-tei, the former residence of the Hosokawa clan, the daimyō of Higo Province during the Edo period. This traditional wooden mansion has a noted Japanese garden located in its grounds.

In 2006, Kumamoto Castle was listed as one of the 100 Fine Castles of Japan by the Japan Castle Foundation. On December 7, 2007, a large-scale renovation of the Inner Palace was completed. A public ceremony for the restoration was held on April 20, 2008.

The castle sustained damage in a magnitude 6.2 earthquake that struck at 9:26 pm on 14 April 2016, in Mashiki town in Kumamoto prefecture. This event is substantially similar to the 1889 Kumamoto earthquake which also damaged the castle. A stone wall at the foot of the keep partially collapsed, and several of the castle's shachihoko ornaments fell from the roof of the keep and broke apart. It sustained further extensive damage the next day on 15 April following a 7.3 magnitude earthquake where some portions were completely destroyed. While the keep itself withstood most of the earthquake with little structural damage, two of the castle's turrets were severely damaged and partially collapsed, more of the exterior walls at the foot of the keep also collapsed, and large amounts of kawara roof tiles on the keep's roof were also disrupted and fell from the roof as a result of the quake. The fallen roof tiles are actually deliberately designed to have done so – when the castle was constructed, such roof tiles were used so that in the event of an earthquake, the tiles would fall off the damaged roof, preventing it from being weighted down and collapsing into the building's interior. 

As of June 8, 2016, the efforts to repair the castle have begun. The restoration of the main tower will be completed by 2019. The restoration of the Nagabei Wall was completed in January, 2021. The repair and restoration of the entire castle is scheduled for completion by the year 2052. On April 7, 2018, the newly made shachihoko ornament had been installed on the top roof of the large tenshu tower with the second one being installed on April 12.

Gallery
Old photographs

Present exterior

See also

Japanese castle
List of Special Places of Scenic Beauty, Special Historic Sites and Special Natural Monuments
History of Kumamoto Prefecture
1889 Kumamoto earthquake

References

Bibliography
Benesch, Oleg. "Castles and the Militarisation of Urban Society in Imperial Japan," Transactions of the Royal Historical Society, Vol. 28 (Dec. 2018), pp. 107-134.

External links

Kumamoto Castle official homepage (in Japanese, English, Korean, Chinese)

Castles in Kumamoto Prefecture
Buildings and structures in Kumamoto
Special Historic Sites
100 Fine Castles of Japan